Burton is a civil parish in Sunbury County, New Brunswick, Canada.

For governance purposes it was divided between the town of Oromocto, the Indian reserve of Oromocto 26, CFB Gagetown, and the local service district of the parish of Burton. The town and LSD are both members of Regional Service Commission 11 (RSC11).

Origin of name
The parish was named in honour of Ralph Burton, military commander-in-chief in Montreal at the time of its establishment as a township.

History
Burton was first established in 1765 as a Nova Scotia township.

Burton was erected in 1786 as one of the original parishes of Sunbury County. The parish extended further inland than the township.

In 1835 the rear of the parish was included in the newly erected Blissville Parish.

In 1896 the boundary with Blissville was altered along the Nerepis Road.

In 1949 the boundary with Blissville was changed back to its pre-1896 course.

Boundaries
Burton Parish is bounded:

 on the north by the Saint John River;
 on the southeast by the Queens County line;
 on the south by a line beginning at a point on the Queens County line about 18.2 kilometres inland, then running north 66º west to the Oromocto River at a point about 1.2 kilometres downstream of the mouth of Shaw Creek;
 on the west and northwest by the Oromocto River;
 including Gilbert, Ox, and Ram Islands in the Saint John River.

Communities
Communities at least partly within the parish; bold indicates an incorporated municipality or Indian reserve; italics indicate a community expropriated for CFB Gagetown

 Babbitt
 Burpees Corner
 Burton
 French Lake
 Geary
 Goan
 Greenfield Settlement
 Haneytown
 Hersey Corner
 Lauvina
 Lower Burton
 McGowans Corner
 Oromocto
 Oromocto West
 Oromocto 26
 Shirley Settlement
 Swan Creek
 Victoria Settlement
 Waterville
 Woodside

Bodies of water
Bodies of water at least partly in the parish:

 Oromocto River
 Saint John River
 Ox Island Channel
 Sheffield Channel
 Rockwell Stream
 Fish Creek
 Kenney Creek
 Snake Creek
 Streets Creek
 Tapley Creek
 French Lake
 Swan Creek Lake

Islands
Islands in the parish:
 Gilbert Island
 Ox Island
 Ram Island

Other notable places
Parks, historic sites, and other noteworthy places in the parish.
 CFB Gagetown

Demographics
Parish population total does not include Oromocto 26 Indian reserve and area within 2021 boundaries of Oromocto. Revised census figures based on the 2023 local governance reforms have not been released.

Population
Population trend

Language
Mother tongue (2016)

Access Routes
Highways and numbered routes that run through the parish, including external routes that start or finish at the parish limits:

Highways

Principal Routes

Secondary Routes:
None

External Routes:
None

See also
List of parishes in New Brunswick

Notes

References

External links
 Burton-Greater Geary Local Service District
 Town of Oromocto

Parishes of Sunbury County, New Brunswick
Local service districts of Sunbury County, New Brunswick
Canada geography articles needing translation from French Wikipedia